Hatillo is a town and municipality located in Puerto Rico's north coast, bordered by the Atlantic Ocean to the north, Lares and Utuado to the south, Camuy to the west, and Arecibo to the east. According to the 2000 US Census Hatillo is spread over nine barrios and Hatillo Pueblo (the downtown area and the administrative center of the city). It is part of the San Juan-Caguas-Guaynabo Metropolitan Statistical Area.

History
Agustín Ruiz Miranda, a Canarian immigrant, founded Hatillo on approximately ten  (a cuerda is 0.97 acre, also called a Spanish acre) in 1823. Miranda granted this land on the condition that public buildings be erected and wide streets be built, and that the remaining land be sold or used for homes.

In its first year, Hatillo had 910 people; increasing to 2,663 inhabitants the following year distributed among the central town and the barrios of Carrizales, Capáez, Naranjito, Corcovado, Buena Vista (formerly Yeguada Occidental), Campo Alegre (formerly Yeguada Oriental), Pajuil, Bayaney, Aibonito, and the Pueblo. Barrio Pajuil had disappeared by the 1940 census being divided up between Buena Vista, Naranjito, Corcovado and Campo Alegre barrios. There were also two sugarcane plantations named “Hacienda Santa Rosa” measuring 150  and “Hacienda Perseverancia” at 50 .

Puerto Rico was ceded by Spain in the aftermath of the Spanish–American War under the terms of the Treaty of Paris of 1898 and became a territory of the United States.  In 1899, the United States Department of War conducted a census of Puerto Rico finding that the population of Hatillo was 1,148.

Hatillo, like several other municipalities on the island, experienced boundary changes from the 1902 municipality consolidation law (Consolidación de Ciertos Términos Municipales de Puerto Rico) in which Hatillo was annexed temporarily into neighboring Camuy. Three years later the territorial legislature approved the reformation of Hatillo as a separate municipality (independent town) from Camuy in 1905. In 1910, Barrio Pueblo (rural) changed its name to Hatillo barrio (rural). In 1930, Yeguadilla Occidental and Yeguadilla Oriental barrios' names were changed to Buena Vista and Campo Alegre, respectively. As mentioned before, Pajuil barrio disappeared by the 1940 census being divided up between barrios Buena Vista, Naranjito, Corcovado and Campo Alegre. In 1947 the Planning Commission of Puerto Rico issued a new map of Hatillo municipality and its barrios. As a result of this new map, the central town was expanded to include part of Hatillo barrio (rural) and the name of “Corcovados” was changed to "Corcovado”.

On September 20, 2017 Hurricane Maria struck Puerto Rico.  In Hatillo,  residences and municipal buildings sustained damage. The 75 dairy farms which produce much of the milk consumed in Puerto Rico were greatly affected. Ranchers said milk production would decrease by up to 45% in 2017. The hurricane triggered numerous landslides in Hatillo.

Geography 

Hatillo is a coastal town on the northern side of Puerto Rico, on the Northern Karst region. There are 9 bridges in Hatillo.

Barrios 

Like all municipalities of Puerto Rico, Hatillo is subdivided into barrios.

 Aibonito
 Bayaney
 Buena Vista
 Campo Alegre
 Capáez
 Carrizales
 Corcovado
 Hatillo
 Hatillo barrio-pueblo
 Naranjito

Sectors
Barrios (which are like minor civil divisions) and subbarrios, in turn, are further subdivided into smaller local populated place areas/units called sectores (sectors in English). The types of sectores may vary, from normally sector to urbanización to reparto to barriada to residencial, among others.

Special Communities

 (Special Communities of Puerto Rico) are marginalized communities whose citizens are experiencing a certain amount of social exclusion. A map shows these communities occur in nearly every municipality of the commonwealth. Of the 742 places that were on the list in 2014, the following barrios, communities, sectors, or neighborhoods were in Hatillo: Altos de Fuego, Clan neighborhood, Aibonito, Naranjito, Bayaney, and Buena Vista.

Tourism

Landmarks and places of interest
There are 10 beaches in Hatillo.
Other places of interest in Hatillo include:

 Antigua Central Bayaney
 Francisco "Pancho" Deida Méndez Coliseum
 Hacienda Santa Rosa Ruins
 Iglesia de Nuestra Señora del Carmen
 José Antonio Monrouzeau Theater
 Juan Carmelo "Tito" Rodríguez Donate Stadium
 La Marina Beach
 Los Ilustres Park
 Paseo del Carmen
 Plaza del Norte Mall
 Sardinera Beach
 Trapiche de Santa Rosa
 Virgen del Carmen Parish

Economy

Agriculture

Today, Hatillo is the major producer of milk on the island and produces a third of the milk consumed in Puerto Rico.

Business
Plaza del Norte is a shopping mall located in the barrio of Carrizales.

Demographics

Culture

Festivals and events
Hatillo celebrates its patron saint festival in July. The  is a religious and cultural celebration that generally features parades, games, artisans, amusement rides, regional food, and live entertainment.

Other festivals and events celebrated in Hatillo include:

 Fiestas de la Cruz - May
  - May
 Hatillo Music And Culinary Fest - May
 - May
  - June
  - October
 Cooperative Movement Traditional festival- October
  (Mask Festival)- December
 Christmas festival - December

The Mask Festival began in 1823, and was imported by the immigrants from the Canary Islands, where the traditional festival originated. The early tradition of the festival required that the male population dress as women and they would visit each residence where the owners would offer them food and drinks. Currently the festival is celebrated every year on December 28. The Masks are fashioned and based on the biblical story of King Herod (Herod the Great). The costumes used are very elaborate and the Masks represent the soldiers which were sent by the King Herod to kill all boys age three and younger, after hearing about a new king being born as told by the Three Wise Men. The festival, however is presented in humor and said soldiers only joke around and ride on chariots.

Symbols
The  has an official flag and coat of arms.

Flag
The flag consists of three broad stripes - Blue, Yellow and Green. Blue represents the sea, yellow represents the material and artistic wealth of the town, and green represents the vegetation of its fields in all its territorial extension.

Coat of arms
On top of the shield is a gold crown with three towers over a silver field a Custard apple tree (Annona reticulata) and a field with two cows in gold which is over eight blue and silver-plated waves. At the center is a shield of "La Orden del Carmen". Under the shield the motto is inscribed, Hatillo Del Corazón.

Gallery

See also

 List of Puerto Ricans
 History of Puerto Rico

References

External links
 Hatillo and its barrios, United States Census Bureau
 Puerto Rico Government Directory - Hatillo
 Local website with history and images of Hatillo

 
Municipalities of Puerto Rico
Populated coastal places in Puerto Rico
Populated places established in 1823
San Juan–Caguas–Guaynabo metropolitan area